Bolur Dokan  (also Romanized as Bolūr Dokān) is a village in Lat Leyl Rural District, Otaqvar, Gilan Province, Iran. At the 2006 census, its population was 158, in 42 families.

References 

Populated places in Langarud County